Hazardia cana is a rare North American species of shrubs in the family Asteraceae known by the common names Guadalupe hazardia, San Clemente Island hazardia, or simply island hazardia. It is native to San Clemente Island, one of the Channel Islands of California, and to Guadalupe Island (part of the State of Baja California).

At the ends of its grayish stems it produces cylindrical flower heads. Each flower head has several rows of dark-colored phyllaries and an open end revealing disc florets and longer protruding ray florets. The florets are yellow when young but may age to red or purple. The main threat to this species on San Clemente Island was the presence of feral goats. The goats have been removed from the island and the plant is recovering.

References

External links
   Calflora Database:  Hazardia cana (Guadalupe hazardia, San Clemente Island hazardia)
Jepson Manual Treatment of   Hazardia cana
Missouri Botanical Garden: herbarium specimen + isotype of Diplostephium canum/Hazardia cana — collected on Guadalupe Island in 1875.
UC CalPhotos gallery of   Hazardia cana images

cana
Flora of California
Flora of Baja California
Flora of Mexican Pacific Islands
Natural history of the Channel Islands of California
Natural history of the California chaparral and woodlands
Endangered biota of Mexico
Endangered flora of North America
Plants described in 1876
Taxa named by Asa Gray
Taxa named by Edward Lee Greene